The 1965 Holy Cross Crusaders football team was an American football team that represented the College of the Holy Cross as an independent during the 1965 NCAA University Division football season. First-year head coach Mel Massucco led the team to a record of 2–7–1.

All home games were played at Fitton Field on the Holy Cross campus in Worcester, Massachusetts.

Schedule

Statistical leaders
Statistical leaders for the 1965 Crusaders included: 
 Rushing: Earl Kirmser, 303 yards and 2 touchdowns on 93 attempts
 Passing: Tom Tyler, 357 yards, 29 completions and 1 touchdown on 70 attempts
 Receiving: Pete Kimener, 221 yards on 21 receptions
 Scoring: Mike Kaminski, 15 points from 6 PATs and 3 field goals
 Total offense: Tom Tyler, 304 yards (357 passing, minus-53 rushing)
 All-purpose yards: Brian Flatley, 542 yards (314 returning, 128 receiving, 100 rushing)

References

Holy Cross
Holy Cross Crusaders football seasons
Holy Cross Crusaders football